The Arveyron is a left tributary to the river Arve, rising in the famous Mer de Glace just above Chamonix in south-eastern France. It flows into the Arve in Chamonix.

References

Rivers of France
Rivers of Auvergne-Rhône-Alpes
Rivers of Haute-Savoie